Clypeomorus bifasciata is a species of sea snail, a marine gastropod mollusk in the family Cerithiidae.

Subspecies
 Clypeomorus bifasciata bifasciata (G. B. Sowerby II, 1855)
 Clypeomorus bifasciata persica Houbrick, 1985

Description
The size of the shell varies between 12 mm and 40 mm.

Distribution
This marine species occurs in the Indo Pacific, from the Red Sea to the Samoa Islands; off Australia (Northern Territory, Queensland and Western Australia).

References

 Sowerby, G.B. 1855. Thesaurus Conchyliorum, or monographs of genera of shells. London : Sowerby Vol. 2(16) 847–899, pls 176–186. 
 Houbrick R.S. 1985. Genus Clypeomorus Jousseaume (Cerithiidae: Prosobranchia). Smithsonian Contributions to Zoology 403: 1-131

External links
 

Clypeomorus
Gastropods described in 1855